Mezzanine is a Content Management System written in Python using the Django framework.  It was initially developed by Stephen McDonald in 2010, then formally released for use in 2012.  McDonald wrote in a blog post that reception to Mezzanine was mostly positive, with the most notable feedback coming from GitHub users. 

Though McDonald is the creator of Mezzanine, there are multiple developers who are credited with assisting its growth and development. The Mezzanine website cites Ken Bolton, Josh Cartmell, and Ross A. Laird as advocates and supporters.  According to the Mezzanine website, the content management system features Twitter integration, Google Analytics support, and custom templates, among others.

References

External links 
 

Free content management systems
Free software programmed in Python
Software using the BSD license